Henry Lawrence Blamires (17 April 1871 – 18 August 1965) was a New Zealand first-class cricketer and clergyman.

Personal life and clerical career
One of five brothers who became clergymen, Henry Blamires was born in Bendigo, Australia, and educated at Wesley College in Melbourne, which was then a Methodist school for boys. He was ordained in 1900 and appointed minister to the Wesleyan church in Hamilton, New Zealand. He served as minister in Gore from 1903. He served as a chaplain with the New Zealand forces in World War I.

He married Jane Collier, a teacher of the blind, in Auckland in March 1900. They had three children.

Cricket career
Blamires played three first-class matches for Hawke's Bay. In his first match, aged 40, against Wellington, he made 55 not out in the second innings. His brother Ernest made his first-class debut in the same match, playing for Wellington. In his next match the next season, also against Wellington, he made 37 in the first innings before being bowled by Clarrie Grimmett. Two weeks later he captained Hawke's Bay against the touring Australians, but was dismissed cheaply twice by Arthur Mailey. It was Blamires's last first-class match.

He continued to play cricket for many years. He played Hawke Cup matches in the 1920s for Wanganui, Nelson and Wairarapa, for whom in his last match at the age of 57 he top-scored with 56.

References

External links
 
Henry Blamires at CricketArchive

1881 births
1963 deaths
New Zealand cricketers
New Zealand Methodist ministers
New Zealand military chaplains
Sportspeople from Bendigo
Hawke's Bay cricketers
People educated at Wesley College (Victoria)
Australian emigrants to New Zealand